Marasmius capillaris is a species of agaric fungus in the family Marasmiaceae. A saprobic fungus, it produces fruit bodies (mushrooms) that grows in groups on decaying oak leaves in North America. Its spore print is white, and the spores are smooth and pip-shaped, measuring 7–11 by 3–5 μm. The mushrooms somewhat resemble Marasmius rotula, but are smaller and darker in color.

References

External links

capillaris
Fungi described in 1883
Fungi of North America